"Gubat na Mapanglaw" (English: "The Dark Forest") is a Filipino poem written in the popular Filipino epic Florante at Laura. The poem was originally written by Francisco Baltazar and was translated into English by Rolando Tinio.

References 

Filipino poems